Norman Salo Fegidero Jr. (born January 28, 1970) is a Filipino football coach and former player. He last coached the Azkals Development Team and the Philippines U23 national team. A midfielder, he represented the Philippines national team from 1989 to 2001 and later became their coach in 2008.

Career

International
For twelve years, 1989 until 2001, Norman Fegidero played for the Philippines national team. The highlight of his career is when he was instrumental to the 1–0 upset against Malaysia at the 1991 Southeast Asian Games. He secured the winning goal at the 84th minute.

As a coach

Philippines
He was a head coach of the Philippines national football team in 2008.

Pachanga
Since 2011 until 2012 he coached Pachanga

University of St. La Salle
In December 2016, it was reported that Fegidero is serving as head coach of the under-21 team of La Salle.

Philippines U23 and  ADT
In 2022, Fegidero was appointed as head coach of the Philippines national U23 team which will compete at the 2021 Southeast Asian Games and the Azkals Development Team.

International goals
Scores and results list the Philippines' goal tally first.

References

External links
 
 Profile at Soccerpunter.com

1970 births
Living people
Filipino footballers
Association football midfielders
Filipino football head coaches
Philippines national football team managers
Philippines international footballers
Footballers from Negros Occidental
Place of birth missing (living people)